The Men's junior time trial of the 2013 UCI Road World Championships took place in Tuscany, Italy on 24 September 2013.

Qualification

Final classification

Source

References

Men's junior time trial
UCI Road World Championships – Men's junior time trial
2013 in men's road cycling